Didineis nodosa is a species of wasp in the family Crabronidae. It is found in Central America and North America.

Subspecies
These two subspecies belong to the species Didineis nodosa:
 Didineis nodosa clypeata Malloch & Rohwer
 Didineis nodosa nodosa

References

Crabronidae
Articles created by Qbugbot
Insects described in 1894